Charles Harrison Blackley  (5 April 1820 – 4 September 1900) was the discoverer of the mechanism behind allergic rhinitis caused by pollen, commonly called hay fever. The isolation of hay fever as a condition had been known since 1819 through the work of John Bostock. Blackley was the first to connect pollen to the condition, and though he held some later discredited views, his insight was an important step in the research of allergens. His most important work was a book titled the Experimental Researches on the Causes and Nature of Catarrhus aestivus, published in 1873.

 
Charles Darwin had read this book and wrote to thank him for it. He was very interested in Blackley’s experiments and in another letter explained that some pollens are wind-blown while others depend on insects for dispersal, for which Blackley was extremely grateful.  Correspondence between Blackley and Darwin is being published through the Darwin Correspondence Project.

References

Further reading 

 Blackley, C. H. (1873) Experimental Researches on the Causes and Nature of Catarrhus Aestivus (Hay-Fever or Hay-Asthma). Online at the Web Archive
 Blackley, C. H. (1880). Hay Fever: Its Causes, Treatment, and Effective Prevention. Online at the Web Archive
 Portrait of Blackley, and associated metadata

External links 
 
 Darwin Correspondence Project

1820 births
1900 deaths
People from Bolton
19th-century English medical doctors